Detto Mariano (27 July 1937 – 25 March 2020) was an Italian composer, arranger, lyricist, pianist, record producer and music publisher.

Early life and career 
Born Mariano Detto in Monte Urano, Mariano started his career in 1958 but was launched by entering Adriano Celentano's "Clan Celentano", becoming keyboardist in his accompanying group "I Ribelli", sporadic lyricist and official arranger of all the songs of the Clan between 1962 and 1967. He also collaborated with Lucio Battisti, Mina, Milva, Equipe 84. Later he focused on composing numerous film soundtracks, especially comedy films.

Death
On 25 March 2020, Mariano died of COVID-19 at the age of 82.

References

External links 
 
 Detto Mariano at Discogs

1934 births
2020 deaths
Italian film score composers
Italian male film score composers
People from Ascoli Piceno
Deaths from the COVID-19 pandemic in Lombardy